Hell, in comics, may refer to:

Hell (DC Comics) a DC Comics location
Hell, a Marvel Comics location composed by several pocket dimensions with which one occupied by a number of devils

See also
Hell (disambiguation)